Jem is a given name, sometimes as a nickname for James, Jeremiah, Jeremy, Jemma, or Jemima, and sometimes as an anglicized version of the Turkish name Cem.

People with the name include:

 Jem Belcher (1781–1811), English bare-knuckle boxer
 Jem Cohen, American filmmaker
 Jem Finer (born 1955), English musician, artist and composer, a founding member of the Pogues
 Jem Karacan, English footballer
 Jem Mace (1831–1910), English bare-knuckle boxer
 Jem Smith, boxer
 Jem Stansfield (born 1975), inventor and television presenter
 Jem Ward (1800–1884), English bare-knuckle boxer

Fictional characters 
 Jem Finch in To Kill a Mockingbird
 Jem Costello, in TV series Hollyoaks
 Jem and the Holograms,  in Jem animated TV series
 James "Jem" Carstairs in The Infernal Devices trilogy
 James Matthew "Jem" Blythe in Anne Shirley franchise

See also
 Jem (disambiguation)